Craig Fitzgibbon (born 16 June 1977) is an Australian professional rugby league coach and a former professional rugby league footballer who played in the 1990s, 2000s and 2010s and is the current head coach of Cronulla-Sutherland Sharks.

A New South Wales State of Origin and Australia international representative goal-kicking forward, he played in the NRL for the Illawarra Steelers and St. George Illawarra Dragons as well as for the Sydney Roosters, with whom he won the 2002 NRL Premiership. Fitzgibbon then played in the Super League for Hull FC. He was also the last coach of the Country New South Wales rugby league team.

Early years
The son of former professional rugby league footballer and coach Allan Fitzgibbon, Craig Fitzgibbon played his first game of junior football with the Dapto under-9Bs. His heroes as a child were Gavin Miller, Bradley Clyde and Andrew Ettingshausen.

Playing career

National Rugby League
Fitzgibbon began his playing career for the Illawarra Steelers in 1998. In his first season, he was the Steelers' top point-scorer and was named rookie of the year. Following the Steelers' joint-venture with St. George, he played for the joint-venture club St. George Illawarra Dragons. Fitzgibbon played from the bench in the 1999 NRL Grand Final, scoring the first try in St. George Illawarra's 20–18 loss.

Fitzgibbon subsequently transferred to the Sydney Roosters in 2000. He played at second-row forward and scored a try in the Roosters' 2000 NRL Grand Final loss to the Brisbane Broncos. Eventually, Fitzgibbon won a premiership with the Roosters, playing at second-row forward in their 2002 NRL grand final victory over the New Zealand Warriors and winning the Clive Churchill Medal for his best-on-ground performance.

Having won the 2002 NRL Premiership, the Sydney Roosters travelled to England to play the 2003 World Club Challenge against Super League champions, St Helens R.F.C. Fitzgibbon played at second-row forward, scoring a try and kicking nine goals in Sydney's victory. In the 2003 NRL grand final Fitzgibbon played in the second row and was the Roosters' goal-kicker in their loss to the Penrith Panthers. After that he was selected to go on the 2003 Kangaroo tour. Fitzgibbon played for the Roosters at second-row forward in their 2004 NRL grand final loss to cross-Sydney rivals, Canterbury-Bankstown. Fitzgibbon was selected in the Australian team to go and compete in the end of season 2004 Rugby League Tri-Nations tournament. In the final against Great Britain he played from the interchange bench and kicked two goals in the Kangaroos' 44–4 victory.

In 2006, Fitzgibbon succeeded Luke Ricketson as captain of the Sydney Roosters. On 12 August 2006, he became the highest scoring forward in premiership history, surpassing ex-Canberra Raiders back-rower David Furner. Fitzgibbon passed the previous record of 1218 points by converting winger Sam Perrett's third try in the 64th minute after beginning the match four points behind the Canberra forward. In August 2008, Fitzgibbon was named in the preliminary 46-man Kangaroos squad for the 2008 Rugby League World Cup, and in October 2008 he was selected in the final 24-man Australia squad. On 16 May 2009 it was announced that Craig had signed a one-year deal, with the option of a second year, with Super League side Hull F.C. for the 2010 season.

Super League
Craig Fitzgibbon was selected for the Exiles squad for the Rugby League International Origin Match against England at Headingley on 10 
June 2011. On 3 September 2011 Fitzgibbon suffered a fracture and ligament damage to his ankle and announced his retirement at the age of 34. On the 26 September announced he would return to the Sydney Roosters in 2012 as a part of its Coaching Staff

Highlights
 Played in the 1999, 2000, 2002, 2003 & 2004 Grand Finals (scored 3 tries & kicked 9 goals for 30 points)
 Won the Clive Churchill Medal in the 2002 Grand Final
 Played 8 games for New South Wales 2003–2005 (scored one try & kicked 16 goals for 36 points)
 Played 15 games for Australia 2002–2005 (scored 3 tries & kicked 39 goals for 90 points)
 Played 4 games for Country vs. City 2002, 2004, 2005 & 2006
 Craig Fitzgibbon is the highest point scoring forward (1560 points)
 Has played 239 first grade games (scored 39 tries & kicked 700 goals for 1560 Points)
 Has kicked over 600 goals for the Sydney Roosters
 One of the last remaining Illawarra Steelers players (Along with Trent Barrett and Luke Patten)

Coaching career
On 24 August 2015, Fitzgibbon was named as coach for the Country New South Wales rugby league team, replacing Trent Barrett for 2016.
Fitzgibbon announced in April 2021 that he had signed a three-year contract to coach the Cronulla-Sutherland Sharks from 2022 onwards. Fitzgibbon was forced to miss coaching the Sharks' first game of the 2022 NRL season as he was in isolation due to contracting COVID-19. Assistant coach Steve Price deputized for him, with Fitzgibbon working remotely.  In Fitzgibbon's first year as Cronulla head coach, he guided the club to a second place finish on the table which qualified the club for the finals.  However, Cronulla would exit the finals series in disappointing fashion, going out in straight sets after losing to North Queensland in extra-time and then to South Sydney the following week.

On 14 February 2023, Fitzgibbon signed a five-year contract extension to remain as Cronulla's head coach until the end of the 2027 season.

References

External links

Sydney Roosters profile
 National Rugby League Profile National Rugby League Home
 Craig Fitzgibbon Rugby League Tables & Statistics
 State of Origin / New South Wales Players Rugby League Tables & Statistics
Sydney Roosters profile
 Illawarra Steelers Profile
 Craig Fitzgibbon to Hull FC Hull FC website
History → Coaches & Captains at hullfc.com

1977 births
Living people
Australia national rugby league team players
Australian people of Irish descent
Australian rugby league coaches
Clive Churchill Medal winners
Country New South Wales Origin rugby league team players
Exiles rugby league team players
Hull F.C. players
Illawarra Steelers players
New South Wales Rugby League State of Origin players
Prime Minister's XIII players
Rugby league locks
Rugby league players from Wollongong
Rugby league second-rows
St. George Illawarra Dragons players
Sydney Roosters captains